is a female Japanese illustrator and manga artist. She was one of the members of Kero Q and Makura.

List of Works

Visual novels
Under BLUEWATER
 Diagnosis (March 24, 2006)
 Despair Witch (February 11, 2007)
 Diagnosis2 (May 11, 2007)

Under Petit Kero Q
 Day when television disappeared (August 31, 2007)

Under Makura
 Supreme Candy (September 26, 2008)
 Ikinari Anata ni Koishiteiru (July 29, 2011)

Under Lump of Sugar
 Gaku Ou -THE ROYAL SEVEN STARS- (January 27, 2012)
 Magical Charming! (May 31, 2013)

Illustrations
 The Iceblade Sorcerer Shall Rule the World (Kodansha Ranobe Bunko)
 Lilith ni Omakase! (ASCII Media Works, Dengeki Bunko)
 Tsuki Tsuki! (MF Bunko J)
 Unlimited Fafnir (Kodansha Ranobe Bunko)

Manga
 Alice or Alice (Monthly Comic Alive)
IP Police Tsuduki-chan (Yatate Bunko)

See also
 Dōjinshi

References

External links
 Riko Korie's official website 

Japanese illustrators
Living people
People from Tokyo
Year of birth missing (living people)